is a Japanese television jidaigeki or period drama that was broadcast in prime-time in 1995 on Fuji TV. It is based on Shōtarō Ikenami's novel of the same title. It stars Tsutomu Yamazaki.

Plot 
In the Kyōhō period, there was a group of bandits called Kumokiri from the people of Edo. Tokugawa shogunate appoints Abe Shikibu a head post of the Hitsuke Tōzoku Aratamegata to arrest Kumokiri clan.

Cast
 Tsutomu Yamazaki : Kumokiri Nizaemon 
 Renji Ishibashi : Kinezumi no Kichigorō
 Atsuo Nakamura : Abe Shikibu
 Tetsurō Tamba : Tsuji Kuranosuke
 Hirotarō Honda : Kumagorō
 Naomasa Musaka : Tominoichi
 Takehiko Ono : Fukuemon
 Kōjirō Kusanagi : Echigoya Zenemon
 Kimiko Ikegami : Nanabake no Ochiyo
 Ken Nishida : Yamada
 Sei Hiraizumi : Okada
 Shigeru Kōyama : Matsuya Denbei

Other adaptation 
 Bandits vs. Samurai Squadron

References

1995 Japanese television series debuts
1990s drama television series
Jidaigeki television series
Television shows based on Japanese novels